Families, Systems and Health is a peer-reviewed academic journal published by the American Psychological Association on behalf of the Collaborative Family Healthcare Association. It was established in 1983 and covers research in the areas of health systems, health care, and family science, especially integrated care. The current editors-in-chief are Jodi Polaha (East Tennessee State University ) and Nadiya Sunderji (University of Toronto).

Abstracting and indexing 
According to the Journal Citation Reports, the journal has a 2020 impact factor of 1.95.

References

External links 
 

American Psychological Association academic journals
English-language journals
Healthcare journals
Quarterly journals
Publications established in 1983